A total lunar eclipse took place at 0308 UT (GMT) on Thursday, August 17, 1989, the second of two total lunar eclipses in 1989.

The moon passed through the center of the Earth's shadow.

Visibility 

It was seen completely over South America, and rising over North America, and setting over Africa, and Europe.

Relations to other lunar eclipses

Eclipses of 1989 
 A total lunar eclipse on February 20.
 A partial solar eclipse on March 7.
 A total lunar eclipse on August 17.
 A partial solar eclipse on August 31.

Lunar year series 
This eclipse is the second of four lunar year eclipses occurring at the moon's ascending node.

The lunar year series repeats after 12 lunations or 354 days (Shifting back about 10 days in sequential years). Because of the date shift, the Earth's shadow will be about 11 degrees west in sequential events.

Saros series 

Lunar Saros 128 contains 15 total lunar eclipses between 1845 and 2097 (in years 1845, 1863, 1881, 1899, 1917, 1935, 1953, 1971, 1989, 2007, 2025, 2043, 2061, 2079 and 2097). Solar Saros 135 interleaves with this lunar saros with an event occurring every 9 years 5 days alternating between each saros series.

Metonic series 
It is the third of five Metonic cycle eclipses, each being separated by 19 years:

Tritos series

Half-Saros cycle
A lunar eclipse will be preceded and followed by solar eclipses by 9 years and 5.5 days (a half saros). This lunar eclipse is related to two annular solar eclipses of Solar Saros 135.

See also 
List of lunar eclipses
List of 20th-century lunar eclipses

Notes

External links 
 

1989-08
1989-08
1989 in science
August 1989 events